Kornitz may refer to:

 Poland
 German name of Kornice, Poland

 Czech Republic
 German name of Chornice, Svitavy Districy
 German name of Kornice, Litomyšl, Svitavy Districy